Scatoglyphus is a genus of mites in the family Acaridae.

Species
 Scatoglyphus polytrematus Berlese, 1913

References

Acaridae